Douglas Sadownick is an American writer, activist, professor and psychotherapist.

Biography
Born in the Bronx in 1959, Douglas Sadownick attended Columbia College for his B.A., New York University for his graduate work in English, and the graduate program in clinical psychology at Antioch University for a Master's of Arts in Clinical Psychology.  He received his Ph.D. from Pacifica Graduate Institute in Clinical Psychology in 2006. His dissertation was entitled, Homosexual Enlightenment: A Gay Science Perspective on 19th Century German philosopher Friedrich Nietzsche's Thus Spoke Zarathustra.

He is the founding director of the nation's first LGBT Specialization in Clinical Psychology, at Antioch University, and he is also the Founder of Colors LGBTQ Youth Counseling Center, founded in 2011, with Philip Lance, an LGBT affirmative psychologist and community organizer. He is also a co-founding member of the Institute for Uranian Psychoanalysis , which is the first Institute in the world dedicated to deepening homosexual self-realization. He was also a principal co-founder of Highways Performance Art Space in 1989.

His work Sacred Lips of the Bronx (St. Martin's Press, 1994) was nominated for a Lambda Literary Award. His second book, Sex Between Men: An Intimate History of the Sex Lives of Gay Men, Postwar to Present, was published by Harper SanFrancisco in 1996 and 1997. His articles have appeared in the Advocate, the Los Angeles Times, Genre, High Performance, the New York Native, and the L.A. Weekly.  He received a GLAAD award for excellence in reporting in 1991.  He works as a private practice psychotherapist in Hollywood, California.

His paper, "Reading Literature Gay-Affirmatively: A Homosexual Individuation Story," was published in Spring 2006 in the journal Arts and Humanities.

Works
Sacred Lips of the Bronx
Sex Between Men: An Intimate History of the Sex Lives of Gay Men Postwar to Present
Men on Men 4, an anthology

External links 
 article in New York Times: COPING; Growing Up Gay in the Heart of the Bronx
 Institute for Contemporary Uranian Psychoanalysis
 

Living people
American gay writers
Antioch College alumni
Columbia College (New York) alumni
21st-century American psychologists
New York University alumni
American male novelists
20th-century American novelists
American LGBT novelists
20th-century American male writers
20th-century American non-fiction writers
American male non-fiction writers
Year of birth missing (living people)
21st-century LGBT people